Toto vs. Maciste is a 1962 Italian adventure-comedy film directed by Fernando Cerchio. It is a parody of the Sword and Sandal cinema, which was highly successful at the time in Italy.

Plot 
Totokamen is an entertainer and an illusionist who performs in various Egyptian nightclubs assisted by his manager, Tarantenkamen. Taking advantage of cheesy tricks, Totokamen pretends to be the son of the god Amun and to have divine superpowers. 
The Pharaoh Ramses is in the meanwhile facing the betrayal by the strongman Maciste, who has inexplicably joined Egypt's historical enemies (the Assyrians) and is guiding them to an unstoppable attack to the country. This is orchestrated by Ramses' unfaithful wife, who has resorted to witchcraft to charme Maciste and achieve absolute power over the country. On the other hand Ramses' daughter is secretly in love with the strongman.
Upon hearing from a minister about Totokamen's spectacle and claims of demigod status, the pharaoh decides that he should guide Egyptian defense against the invaders. Totokamen and Tarantenkamen try to avoid the dangerous assignment and to buy time in all possible ways, but the Assyrians continue their campaign and the invasion eventually reaches the crucial point of a duel between Totokamen and Maciste, in front of the whole royal court.
Luckily the effect of Maciste's charming runs out at the last possible moment, and the plans of Ramses' wife gets exposed. The Pharaoh remains in power, Maciste is pardoned, and Totokamen manages to exploit the confusion in order to escape from palace before being exposed as a fraud.

Cast 

Totò as Totokamen / Sabakis, Totokamen's father
Nino Taranto as Tarantenkamen
Samson Burke as Maciste
Nadine Sanders as Pharaoh's wife
Nerio Bernardi as Pharaoh Ramses 
Gabriella Andreini as  Nefertiti 
Luigi Pavese as owner of the nightclub
Nino Marchetti as the great dignitary
Piero Palermini as Baitan
Carlo Taranto as Assyrian counsellor

References

External links

1962 films
Italian adventure comedy films
Peplum films
Films directed by Fernando Cerchio
Films scored by Francesco De Masi
Films set in ancient Egypt
1960s adventure comedy films
1960s parody films
Italian parody films
Maciste films
Cultural depictions of Ramesses II
Cultural depictions of Nefertiti
Films with screenplays by Giovanni Grimaldi
Sword and sandal films
1962 comedy films
1960s Italian-language films
1960s Italian films